Virus Meadow is the second studio album by English band And Also the Trees. It was released in 1986, through record label Reflex.

Track listing

Personnel 

 Simon Huw Jones – vocals
 Justin Jones – guitar
 Steven Burrows – bass guitar
 Nick Havas – drums

References

External links 

 

1986 albums
And Also the Trees albums